The Röell cabinet was the cabinet of the Netherlands from 9 May 1894 until 27 July 1897. The cabinet was formed by Independent Liberals (I) after the election of 1894. The right-wing cabinet was a minority government in the House of Representatives but was supported by the Liberal Union (LU) and Independent Catholics (I) for a majority. Independent Conservative Liberal Joan Röell was Prime Minister.

Cabinet Members

References

External links
Official

  Kabinet-Röell Parlement & Politiek

Cabinets of the Netherlands
1894 establishments in the Netherlands
1897 disestablishments in the Netherlands
Cabinets established in 1894
Cabinets disestablished in 1897
Minority governments